Cees Lagrand (born 20 October 1936, Zaandam) is a Dutch sprint canoer who competed in the early 1960s. At the 1960 Summer Olympics in Rome, he was eliminated in the heats of the K-1 4 × 500 m event.

References
Sports-reference.com profile

1936 births
Living people
Canoeists at the 1960 Summer Olympics
Dutch male canoeists
Olympic canoeists of the Netherlands
Sportspeople from Zaanstad
20th-century Dutch people
21st-century Dutch people